Pamidimukkala Mandal is one of the 25 Mandals in the Krishna District of the Indian State of Andhra Pradesh. it is 39 km from Vijayawada. 

There are 28 Villages within the Pamidimukkala mandal. it is also a part of Capital of Andhra Pradesh (APCRDA). The headquarters of Pamidimukkala mandal is located in Veerankilaku. Chennuruvaripalem is the least populated and Kapileswarapuram is the most highly populated village in Pamidimukkala mandal.

Villages 

As of 2011 Census, Pamidimukkala Mandal has 21 villages.

The settlements in the mandal are:
 Aginiparru	
 Ameenapuram
 Chennuruvaripalem
 Choragudi
 Fathelanka 	
 Gopuvanipalem
 Gurazada 	
 Hanumanthapuram	
 Inampudi 	
 Inapuru	
 Kapileswarapuram	
 Krishnapuram
 Kuderu
 Lankapalle
 Mamillapalle  
 Mantada
 Marrivada 
 Meduru
 Mullapudi
 Pamidimukkala(Veerankilaku)
 Penumatcha

References 

Mandals in Krishna district